Kenger-Meneuz (Qıñğır-Mänäwez) is a rural locality (a village) and the administrative centre of Kenger-Meneuzovsky Selsoviet, Bizhbulyaksky District, Bashkortostan, Russia. The population was 1,323 as of 2010. There are 9 streets.

Geography 
Kenger-Meneuz is located 10 km east of Bizhbulyak (the district's administrative centre) by road. Chulpan is the nearest rural locality.

References 

Rural localities in Bizhbulyaksky District